The 2020–21 season was the 122nd season in existence of Watford Football Club and their first season back in the Championship following relegation from the Premier League in the previous season. Watford competed in the FA Cup and in the EFL Cup.

With their win over Millwall on 24 April 2021, Watford confirmed their promotion back to the Premier League at the first time of asking.

Players

Current squad

Transfers

Transfers in

Loans in

Loans out

Transfers out

Pre-season and friendlies

Competitions

Overview

Championship

League table

Results summary

Results by matchday

Matches
The 2020–21 season fixtures were released on 21 August.

FA Cup

The third round draw was made on 30th November, with Premier League and EFL Championship clubs all entering the competition.

EFL Cup

The draw for both the second and third round were confirmed on September 6, live on Sky Sports by Phil Babb.

Appearances and goals

|-
! colspan=14 style=background:#dcdcdc; text-align:center| Goalkeepers

|-
! colspan=14 style=background:#dcdcdc; text-align:center| Defenders

|-
! colspan=14 style=background:#dcdcdc; text-align:center| Midfielders

|-
! colspan=14 style=background:#dcdcdc; text-align:center| Forwards

|-
! colspan=14 style=background:#dcdcdc; text-align:center| Players transferred out during the season

Notes

References

External links

Watford F.C. seasons
Watford F.C.